Waffa may be,

Waffa language, New Guinea
Susan Waffa-Ogoo, Gambia
Waffa Bin Laden, USA/Switzerland